Mollah-ye Tam (also known as Mollā-ye Tam and Mollay Jom) is a village in Kuh Mareh Khami Rural District, in the Central District of Basht County, Kohgiluyeh and Boyer-Ahmad Province, Iran. At the 2006 census, its population was 31, in 7 families.

References 

Populated places in Basht County